Paul Roberts may refer to:

Paul Roberts (musician) (born 1959), British musician, ex-lead singer of The Stranglers
Paul Roberts, British musician with rock group Sniff 'n' the Tears
Paul Roberts, British musician with house music group K-Klass
Paul Roberts (footballer, born 1962), English footballer for several teams in the Football League
Paul Roberts (footballer, born 1977), Welsh footballer
Paul Roberts (author), American journalist and author on resources such as oil and food
Paul V. Roberts (1938–2006), American environmental engineer
Paul Craig Roberts (born 1939), American economist
Paul Roberts (cricketer) (1951–1977), English cricketer
Paul William Roberts (1950–2019), Canadian writer born in Wales
Paul Roberts (American footballer) (born 1963), British American football defensive back
Paul Roberts (rugby league) (born 1962), Australian rugby league player

See also
Paul Robert (disambiguation)